Oxomemazine is an antihistamine and anticholinergic of the phenothiazine chemical class for the treatment of cough.

See also 
 Oxomemazine/guaifenesin

References 

Phenothiazines
Benzosulfones
Dimethylamino compounds
Antihistamines
Sedatives